Carmagnola is a comune (municipality) in the Metropolitan City of Turin in the Italian region Piedmont, located  south of Turin. The town is on the right side of the Po river. The nature of the soil determined over time how the river's sand accumulated.

Carmagnola borders the following municipalities: Poirino, Villastellone, Carignano, Lombriasco, Ceresole d'Alba, Racconigi, Sommariva del Bosco, Caramagna Piemonte.

History 

The municipality is mentioned for the first time during the 11th century. The land, originally owned by the Arduinic dynasty, passed to the Marquisate of Saluzzo, who had a castle built here. The Saluzzo dynasty soon underwent a rapid decadence ending with a French domination period which lasted 40 years. In 1588 Carmagnola became a possession of the House of Savoy, when Charles Emmanuel I besieged and conquered it. France took possession of Carmagnola a second time during the 17th century, during the civil war between Madamisti and Principisti (supporters of the French and the Savoy dynasty respectively). In this period (1637–1642), the three main subdivisions were razed to the ground as they were conflicting with the defence structures, and immediately re-built around 1.5 km from their original position, where they still are at the present time.

In 1690 the town was once again occupied by the French general Catinat, but just one year later Victor Amadeus II of Savoy brought it back among Piedmontese possessions. While its defence buildings were being demolished and its strategic role was progressively decreasing in importance, the town could finally develop agriculture and commerce, mainly of hemp and ropes, which were exported in great quantity to Liguria and southern France. The characteristic of both agricultural and commercial site remained important until after World War II, which caused a massive immigration and a rapid urbanistic expansion.

The name of La Carmagnole, the title of a French song and dance made popular during the French Revolution, is considered to be indirectly derived from the Italian town - i.e., the costume of the Piedmontese peasants living near Carmagnola was named for the town; and when some of these peasants came to Paris, their dress influenced the short jacket worn by working-class militant sans-culottes, who sang the song.

Main sights

Abbey of Casanova. It was founded by the Cistercians in the 12th century, although it was mostly rebuilt in a late Baroque style in the 18th century
Lomellini Palace, Contemporary Art Museum (15th century)
Castle, currently used as town hall (13th century)
Collegiate church of Sts. Peter and Paul (1492–1514)
Cascina Vigna, Civic Museum of Natural History
Sant'Agostino church (1406–1437)
San Rocco church (1699–1745)
San Filippo church (1715–1739)
Church of Saint Mary of the Snow (Santa Maria della Neve), Salsasio (17th century)
Synagogue (18th century)
Cavassa House (15th century)
House of the Sundials (Casa delle Meridiane) or Piano House (16th century)
San Lorenzo Hospital (1754–1856)

Economy 

The economy of the town is currently linked to the industry and intensive production of vegetables and cereals, which the particular soil makes very productive. Industry experienced a notable growth during the 1960s, when FIAT opened an important factory, thus attracting a growing number of immigrants from southern Italy. The rapid growth of FIAT made also possible other activities in the metallurgy, electronics, optics, chemical industry, and food industry fields.
Also well-developed are the banking, financial and insurance sectors.

Notable people born in or related to Carmagnola 
Francesco Bussone da Carmagnola (1380–1432), better known as Conte di Carmagnola – Renaissance Captain of Fortune, condottiero.
Lorenzo Valerio (1810–1865) – politician
Enrico Saroldi (1878–1954)  – sculptor
Antonio Tortone – sculptor
Guglielmo Diatto – 19th century founder of the Diatto industrial enterprise.
Francesca Maria Rubatto (1844–1904) – Catholic nun, founder of the Capuchin Sisters of Mother Rubatto
Raffaello Menochio (1858–1943) – Historical scholar and engineer
Angelo Paolo Carena (1740–1769) – Historical scholar
Giacinto Carena (1778–1859) –  Philosopher, philologist, naturalist, secretary of the Science Academy of Turin
Dino Campana (1888–1932) – Poet
Ferruccio Valobra (1898–1944) – Anti-fascist and partisan
Gianluigi Lentini (1969) – Soccer player
Umberto Mastroianni (1910–1998) – Sculptor, partisan, uncle of the actor Marcello Mastroianni
Guido Martina (1906–1991) – Cartoonist
Davide Longo (1971) – Writer
Fabio Troiano (1974) – Actor
Andrea Fiore (1850–1914) – Bishop
Pio Marchi (1895–1942) – Soccer player
Guido Marchi (1896–1969) – Soccer player
Giorgio Sommacal (1961) – Cartoonist
Eusebio Castigliano (1921–1949) – Soccer player, centre half of the Grande Torino died in the Superga air disaster
Caterina Dominici (1829–1894) beatified in 1975

Events 

Peppers Fair (Sagra del Peperone). It is held between the last week of August and the first of September; it is an eno-gastronomic fair dedicated to the most typical product of Carmagnola's agriculture. It attracts over 250,000 visitors each year.
On 5 September 2010 during the 61st Pepper Fair the town of Carmagnola has been entered into the Guinness Book of Records for the biggest pepper soup (peperonata) with a weight of 1,190 kg (2,623.5 pounds).
Spring Fair (Fiera di primavera). Held annually in March, dedicated to agricultural commerce, it features many collateral events.
Mercantico. It takes place on the second Sunday of each month (except August). It is a small, antiques items' market, hosting over 400 stalls along the old town.
Ortoflora e Natura. Held in the first weekend of April in the municipal park Cascina Vigna, the event is dedicated to gardening and horticulture.
Grandparents' National Day (Festa Nazionale dei Nonni). It takes place in the middle of September, inside the park Cascina Vigna. It had its first edition in September 2003.
Other events include "Carmagnola Jazz Festival", "Carmagnola Town of Art and Culture", "National Ornithological Contest", "Regional Beef Cattle Fair".

Twin towns 
  Opatija, Croatia
  Río Tercero, Argentina

References

External links 
 Official website

Cities and towns in Piedmont
Castles in Italy